R. Selvaraj  may refer to:

 R. Selvaraj (politician), Member of the Legislative Assembly (MLA) of Communist Party of India (Marxist) from Indian state of Kerala
 R. Selvaraj (screenwriter), (a.k.a. Annakilli Selvaraj) screenwriter, director and producer from Tamil Nadu